This is a list of members of the Victorian Legislative Council, as elected at the 2014 state election.

Distribution of seats

Members 

 Eastern Victoria Nationals MLC Danny O'Brien resigned on 2 February 2015 to contest the by-election for the lower house seat of Gippsland South. Melina Bath was appointed to replace him on 16 April 2015.
 Northern Victoria Nationals MLC Damian Drum resigned on 26 May 2016 to contest the seat of Murray at the 2016 federal election. Luke O'Sullivan was appointed to replace him on 13 October 2016.
 Northern Victoria Labor MLC Steve Herbert resigned on 6 April 2017. Mark Gepp was appointed to replace him on 7 June 2017.
 Northern Metropolitan Greens MLC Greg Barber resigned on 28 September 2017. Samantha Ratnam was appointed to replace him on 19 October 2017.
 Western Metropolitan DLP MLC Rachel Carling-Jenkins changed party affiliation on 26 June 2017, from the DLP to the Australian Conservatives. On 3 August 2018 she resigned from the Conservatives to sit as an independent.
 Western Metropolitan Greens MLC Colleen Hartland resigned on 8 February 2018. Huong Truong was appointed to replace her on 21 February 2018.

Members of the Parliament of Victoria by term
21st-century Australian politicians
Victorian Legislative Council